Pulvayal  is a village in the Annavasalrevenue block of Pudukkottai district, Tamil Nadu, India.

Demographics 

As per the 2001 census, Pulvayal had a total population of 2102 with 1050 males and 1052 females. Out of the total population 1211    people were literate.

References

Villages in Pudukkottai district